Al-Maqrīzī (full name Taqī al-Dīn Abū al-'Abbās Aḥmad ibn 'Alī ibn 'Abd al-Qādir ibn Muḥammad al-Maqrīzī), 1364–1442, was a medieval Egyptian historian and biographer during the Mamluk era, known for his interest in the Fatimid dynasty and its role in Egyptian history.

Life
A direct student of Ibn Khaldun, al-Maqrīzī was born in Cairo and spent most of his life in Egypt. When he presents himself in his books he usually stops at the 10th forefather although he confessed to some of his close friends that he can trace his ancestry to al-Mu‘izz li-Dīn Allāh – first Fatimid caliph in Egypt and the founder of al-Qahirah – and even to Ali ibn Abi Talib. He was trained in the Hanafite school of law. Later, he switched to the Shafi'ite school and finally to the Zahirite school. Maqrizi studied theology under one of the primary masterminds behind the Zahiri Revolt, and his vocal support and sympathy with that revolt against the Mamluks likely cost him higher administrative and clerical positions with the Mamluk regime. The name Maqrizi was an attribution to a quarter of the city of Baalbek, from where his paternal grandparents hailed. Maqrizi confessed to his contemporaries that he believed that he was related to the Fatimids through the son of al-Muizz. Ibn Hajar preserves the most memorable account: his father, as they entered the al-Hakim Mosque one day, told him "My son, you are entering the mosque of your ancestor." However, his father also instructed al-Maqrizi not to reveal this information to anyone he could not trust; Walker concludes:
Ultimately it would be hard to conclude that al-Maqrizi conceived any more than an antiquarian interest in the Fatimids. His main concern seems more likely to be the meaning they and their city might have for the present, that is, for Mamluk Egypt and its role in Islam. (p. 167)

In 1385, he went on the Islamic pilgrimage, the Hajj. For some time he was secretary in a government office, and in 1399 became inspector of markets for Cairo and northern Egypt. This post he soon gave up to become a preacher at the Mosque of 'Amr ibn al 'As, president of the al-Hakim Mosque, and a lecturer on tradition. In 1408, he went to Damascus to become inspector of the Qalanisryya and lecturer. Later, he retired into private life at Cairo.

In 1430, he again went on Hajj with his family and travelled for some five years. His learning was great, his observation accurate and his judgement good, but his books are largely compilations, and he does not always acknowledge the sources upon which he relied.

Works
Most of al-Maqrizi's works, exceeding 200, are concerned with Egypt.
al-Mawāʻiẓ wa-al-Iʻtibār bi-Dhikr al-Khiṭaṭ wa-al-āthār (Arabic, 2 vols., Bulaq, 1853); French translation by Urbain Bouriant as Description topographique et historique de l'Égypte (Paris, 1895–1900; compare A. R. Guest, "A List of Writers, Books and other Authorities mentioned by El Maqrizi in his Khitat," in Journal of the Royal Asiatic Society, 1902, pp. 103–125). 
Itti‘āz al-Ḥunafā’ bi-Akhbār al-A’immah al-Fāṭimīyīn al-Khulafā’
Kitāb al-Khiṭaṭ al-Maqrīzīyah
Kitāb al-Sulūk li-Ma‘rifat Duwal al-Mulūk
History of the Fatimites; extract published by J.G.L. Kosegarten in Chrestomathia (Leipzig, 1828), pp. 115–123;

History of the Ayyubit and Mameluke Rulers; French translation by Etienne Marc Quatremère (2 vols., Paris, 1837–1845).
Muqaffa, first sixteen-volumes of an Egyptian biographic encyclopedia  arranged in alphabetic order. The Egyptian historian, al-Sakhawi, estimated that the complete  work would require eighty volumes. Three autograph volumes exist in manuscript in Leiden and one in Paris.

Smaller works
Mahomeddan Coinage (ed. O. G. Tychsen, Rostock, 1797; French translation by Silvestre de Sacy, Paris, 1797)
Arab Weights and Measures (ed. Tychsen, Rostock, 1800)
Arabian Tribes that migrated to Egypt (ed. F. Wüstenfeld, Göttingen, 1847)
Account of Hadhramaut (ed. P.B. Noskowyj, Bonn, 1866)
Strife between the Bani Umayya and the Bani Hashim (ed. G. Vos, Leiden, 1888)
Historia Regum Islamiticorum in Abyssinia (ed. and Latin trans. F. T. Rink, Leiden, 1790).

Books
 al-Mawa'iz wa al-'i'tibar bi dhikr al-khitat wa al-'athar (about the planning of Cairo and its monuments)
A. R. Guest, p. 103ff: A list of Writers, Books and other Authorities mentioned by El Maqrisi in his Khitat
 al-Selouk Leme'refatt Dewall al-Melouk (about Mamluk history in Egypt)
 Ette'aaz al-honafa be Akhbaar al-A'emma al-Fatemeyyeen al-Kholafaa (about the Fatimid state)
 al-Bayaan wal E'raab Amma Be Ard Misr min al A'raab (about the Arab Tribes in Egypt)
 Eghathatt al-Omma be Kashf al-Ghomma (about the famines that took place in Egypt)
 al-Muqaffa (biographies of princes and prominent personality of his time)

  (pp. 115 −123: Al-Maqrizi, an extract of History of the Fatimites.)

A. R. Guest, 1902, in Journal of the Royal Asiatic Society, pp. 103–125: "A List of Writers, Books and other Authorities mentioned by El Maqrizi in his Khitat"  (Notes on the 1853-edition)

alternative:

See also
List of Muslim historians
List of Arab scientists and scholars

Notes

References

External links

Mawa'iz, online text (in Arabic)
Account of the Crusade of St. Louis (in English)
On al-Maqrizi

1364 births
1442 deaths
14th-century Arabic writers
Historians from the Mamluk Sultanate
15th-century Arabic writers
15th-century biographers
15th-century Egyptian historians
Egyptian encyclopedists
14th-century Egyptian historians
Writers from Cairo
Zahiris